46 Capricorni is a solitary star located around 790 light years away from the Sun in the southern constellation of Capricornus, near the northern border with Aquarius. It is visible to the naked eye as a dim, yellow-hued point of light  with an apparent visual magnitude of +5.10. 46 Cap is also known by its Bayer designation of c Capricorni (c Cap), and occasionally as c1 Capricorni to distinguish it from the nearby star c2 Capricorni. It is moving closer to the Earth with a heliocentric radial velocity of −15.5 km/s.

This star has received a stellar classification of G8Iab, which suggests it is a G-type supergiant star, as well as G7.5II-IIICN0.5, which instead indicates a luminosity class between a giant and a bright giant. Abundance analysis suggests the star has not yet passed the first dredge-up. It has 4.6 times the mass of the Sun and has expanded to 33 times the Sun's radius. The star is radiating 627 times the luminosity of the Sun from its photosphere at an effective temperature of 4,837 K.

Etymology

This star, along with β Aqr (Sadalsuud) and ξ Aqr (Bunda), were Saʽd al Suʽud (سعد السعود), the Luck of Lucks.

References

G-type supergiants
G-type bright giants
G-type giants
Capricornus (constellation)
Capricorni, c1
Capricorni, 46
BD-09 5829
206834
107382
8311